Prince Gustaf of Sweden and Norway, Duke of Uppland (Frans Gustaf Oscar, 18 June 1827 – 24 September 1852), also known officially as Gustav, was the second son of Oscar I of Sweden and Josephine of Leuchtenberg, and the younger brother of Prince (from 1844 Crown Prince) Charles.

Life

During his childhood he was placed in the care of the royal governess countess Christina Ulrika Taube.

He was a trained musician and under the artist's name of G***** a well known composer. In Sweden, he is remembered for having written a couple of well-known songs. His The Student Song (Studentsången) is traditionally sung at the graduation festivities for gymnasium students, and his Spring Song (Vårsång) is often performed by men's choruses on Walpurgis night.

From 1844 until his death in 1852, Gustaf was second-in-line to the Swedish and Norwegian thrones, during most of his father's reign. On 11 February 1846, he was made an honorary member of the Royal Swedish Academy of Sciences, on the same day as his brother Charles.

He died from typhoid fever.

He was portrayed by Alf Kjellin in Prince Gustaf, a 1944 film about certain aspects of the prince's life.

Honours and arms

Honours
   Sweden-Norway: Knight of the Order of Charles XIII, 22 March 1849

Arms

Ancestry

References 

1827 births
1852 deaths
19th-century male musicians
19th-century Norwegian composers
Burials at Riddarholmen Church
Deaths from typhoid fever
Dukes of Uppland
House of Bernadotte
Knights of the Order of Charles XIII
Members of the Royal Swedish Academy of Sciences
Norwegian princes
People from Solna Municipality
Swedish composers
Swedish Lutherans
Swedish male composers
Swedish people of French descent
Gustaf 1827
Uppsala University alumni
Sons of kings